Katarina Galenić (born 23 May 1997) is a Croatian badminton player. She competed at the 2015 European Games in Baku, Azerbaijan.

Achievements

BWF International Challenge/Series 
Women's doubles

  BWF International Challenge tournament
  BWF International Series tournament
  BWF Future Series tournament

References

External links 
 
 

1997 births
Living people
Sportspeople from Zagreb
Croatian female badminton players
Badminton players at the 2015 European Games
European Games competitors for Croatia
21st-century Croatian women